Tebenna leptilonella is a moth in the family Choreutidae. It was described by August Busck in 1934. It is found on Cuba.

References

Natural History Museum Lepidoptera generic names catalog

Choreutidae
Moths described in 1934
Endemic fauna of Cuba